= Orientpet =

Orientpets, Orienpets or OT hybrid Lilies are a breed of lilies, the result of crosses between orientals and trumpets. They are valued for their appearance, disease-resistance, hardiness and for late blooming.
